Crowley, legally Crowley Maritime Corporation, is based in Jacksonville, Florida. Founded in 1892, Crowley is primarily a family- and employee-owned vessel management, owner, and supply chain logistics services company, providing services globally. As of July 2016, Crowley was ranked as the 13th largest private company in Florida, employing approximately 5,300 people worldwide with revenues of $2.2 billion.  It provides its services using a fleet of more than 300 vessels, consisting of RO-RO vessels, LO-LO vessels, tankers, Articulated Tug-Barges (ATBs), tugs and barges. Crowley's land-based facilities and equipment include terminals, warehouses, tank farms, and specialized vehicles.

History
Crowley was founded in 1892 when founder Thomas Crowley, the grandfather of current Chairman, President and CEO Thomas B. Crowley, Jr., purchased an 18-foot Whitehall Rowboat to provide transportation of personnel and supplies to ships anchored on San Francisco Bay. Within a few years, services broadened to include bay wing and ship assistance services. In addition to acquiring larger vessels, the company expanded in the 1920s into Los Angeles Harbor with tugboats for ship assists and into Puget Sound with tug and barge transportation. Bulk petroleum transportation joined the list of company services in 1939.

In 1958, Crowley moved into Arctic transportation with an agreement to resupply the U.S. government’s Distant Early Warning Line on the Alaska coastline. It was the first penetration of the Arctic by commercial tug and barge services. This led to Crowley’s Alaska common carrier services whereby railcar, breakbulk, containerized and bulk petroleum cargoes were delivered to more than 130 villages, many of which lacked docking facilities.

Beginning in 1968, utilizing the earlier pioneering experience in the Arctic, Crowley began summer sealifts of equipment, supplies, buildings and production modules to Prudhoe Bay.  Since then, 334 barges carrying nearly 1.3 million tons of cargo have been successfully delivered to the North Slope, including modules the size of ten story buildings and weighing nearly 6,000 tons.

In the 1970s, Crowley began transporting cargo between the U.S. and Puerto Rico and later expanded into the rest of the Caribbean, Central America and South America. The service primarily consisted of ships and large, triple-deck barges, some of which were 730 feet in length, carrying cargo in trailers and containers.

In 1973, the American Tugboat Company was acquired by the Crowley Launch and Tugboat Company of San Francisco, California, and merged into their subsidiary operation, the Puget Sound Tug and Barge Company of Seattle, Washington.

In 1989, Crowley tugs were first on the scene of the crippled tanker Exxon Valdez in Prince William Sound, Alaska. The Exxon Valdez oil spill was the second largest in U.S. history (after Deepwater Horizon, 2010) and Crowley was the prime supplier of marine equipment and personnel for the cleanup. To try to avoid future disasters, the Alyeska Pipeline Service Company contracted with Crowley to provide tanker assistance and escort work in Valdez and Prince William Sound using tugs with “best available technology.”

In mid-1994, the top leadership of the corporation changed for only the second time in more than 100 years. Following the passing of his father, Thomas B. Crowley, Jr. was unanimously elected president, chairman of the board, and chief executive officer.

In January 2010, Crowley Liner Services reached an undisclosed settlement with plaintiffs (shippers) who had alleged violations of United States and Puerto Rican antitrust laws. The company publicly denied violating the antitrust laws but said it wanted to be rid of the high cost and burden of litigation, which they expected to continue for several more years. In 2011, Crowley was fined $17,000,000 and pleaded guilty to one federal price fixing charge for conduct arising out of illegal agreements between Crowley and its competitors in the Puerto Rico freight market. Despite the settlement, in May 2015, a Puerto Rican jury acquitted Thomas Farmer, former vice president of price and yield management for Crowley Liner Services, of violating the Sherman Act by allegedly conspiring to suppress and eliminate competition for freight services to the island.

In 2010, following the 7.0 Haiti earthquake that affected more than 3 million people and caused major damage in Port-au-Prince, Crowley (working under contract with the U.S. Transportation Command [USTRANSCOM]), re-established cargo operations in Haiti, allowing humanitarian relief from multiple shippers to enter the country. Crowley and its employees then donated $80,000 to the American Red Cross in support of Haiti relief efforts and transported an estimated 15,000 emergency housing units to the island.

In Dec. 2010, Crowley's Alaska fuel sales and distribution enterprise added eight Shell Oil service stations to its wholesale network. Under the agreement, Crowley had responsibility for the wholesale purchases of Shell motor fuel and transporting, distributing and selling the fuel to 17 independently owned and operated sites in Alaska.

In 2011, Crowley took delivery of the first of several articulated tug barge (ATB) tank vessels.

In the last 20 years, Crowley has shed some of its businesses, including its Red & White Fleet passenger ferry services in San Francisco and its South America shipping services, while expanding in other areas through a series of acquisitions. Crowley bought Marine Transport Corporation, a petroleum and chemical transportation company; Speed Cargo Services, a non-vessel operating common carrier (NVOCC); Apparel Transportation, a Central America logistics services provider to the apparel industry, Yukon Fuel Company and Service Oil and Gas, which are Alaska-based fuel distribution and sales companies, TITAN Salvage, a worldwide salvage and emergency response company, Jensen Maritime Consultants, a Seattle-based Naval Architecture & Marine Engineering firm, and Customized Brokers, a Miami-based customs clearance company specializing in perishable, refrigerated cargoes.

In 2018, VT Halter Maritime delivered the first of two Commitment Class, LNG-powered ConRo ships, the El Coquí. The ship measures 219.5m long with a 26,500 deadweight tons. It can transport up to 2,400 TEU at a cruising speed of 22 knots. The Coquí sister ship, Taino, was delivered in January 2019.

The business was incorporated in the State of Delaware as "Crowley Maritime Corporation" on December 1, 1972. The present structure, in which Crowley Maritime Corporation is a holding company for the business lines, was put in place in 1992. The Company is predominantly owned by members of the Crowley family and company employees, and its stock does not trade on any national stock exchange or in any market.  Revenue in 2009 was nearly $1.6 billion.

Notable Incidents

September 21, 2011
On September 21, 2011 a Crowley Maritime barge carrying 140,000 gallons of aviation fuel and 5,800 gallons of gasoline broke away from a tugboat during rough seas near the western coast of Alaska. Control of the barge was regained later that afternoon.

References

External links
 Guide to the Crowley Maritime Corporation Records at The Bancroft Library

Crowley Maritime Corporation
Marine salvors
Container shipping companies
American companies established in 1892
Transport companies established in 1892
1892 establishments in California
Companies based in Jacksonville, Florida
Arlington, Jacksonville
Tanker shipping companies
Gas shipping companies
Supply shipping companies
Floating production storage and offloading vessel operators
Port operating companies
Multinational companies headquartered in the United States
Logistics companies of the United States
Logistics industry in the United States
Container shipping companies of the United States
Transportation companies based in Florida
Multinational companies based in Jacksonville